Værlandet is an island in Askvoll Municipality in Vestland county, Norway. The  island lies immediately east of the Bulandet island group. There is a regular ferry route connecting Værlandet to the mainland village of Askvoll. There is a series of bridges that connect Værlandet to the islands of Bulandet to the west. Værlandet Chapel is located on the island. In 2001, there were about 200 residents on the islands. The Værlandet LORAN-C transmitter was located on the island, but demolished on 19 Sep 2017.

See also
List of islands of Norway

References

Islands of Vestland
Askvoll